This is a list of notable textbooks on classical mechanics and quantum mechanics arranged according to level and surnames of the authors in alphabetical order.

Undergraduate

Classical mechanics 

 Chapters 1–21. Numerous subsequent editions.

Quantum mechanics 

 Three volumes.

Advanced undergraduate and graduate

Classical mechanics

Quantum mechanics 

Landau, L. D, and Lifshitz, E. M. Course of Theoretical Physics Volume 3 - Quantum Mechanics: Non-Relativistic Theory. Edited by Pitaevskiĭ L. P. Translated by J. B Sykes and J. S Bell, Third edition, revised and enlarged ed., Pergamon Press, 1977. .

See also 

List of textbooks in thermodynamics and statistical mechanics
List of textbooks in electromagnetism
List of books on general relativity

Further reading

External links 
 A Physics Book List. John Baez. Department of Mathematics, University of California, Riverside. 1993-1997.

Textbooks
Lists of science textbooks
 
Mathematics-related lists
Physics-related lists
 
Textbooks